Josef Escher (17 September 1885, in Simplon – 9 December 1954) was a Swiss politician and member of the Swiss Federal Council (1950–1954).

He was elected to the Federal Council of Switzerland on 14 September 1950 resigned on 26 November 1954 and died on 9 December 1954. He was affiliated to the Christian Democratic People's Party of Switzerland. During his office time he held the Department of Posts and Railways.

External links

1885 births
1954 deaths
People from Brig District
Swiss Roman Catholics
Christian Democratic People's Party of Switzerland politicians
Members of the Federal Council (Switzerland)
Members of the National Council (Switzerland)
Presidents of the National Council (Switzerland)
University of Bern alumni